Naumovka is a rural locality (a selo) in Laptevsky Selsoviet, Uglovsky District, Altai Krai, Russia. The population was 305 as of 2013. It was founded in 1912. There are 9 streets.

Geography 
Naumovka is located 75 km south of Uglovskoye (the district's administrative centre) by road. Laptev Log is the nearest rural locality.

References 

Rural localities in Uglovsky District, Altai Krai